Group C of UEFA Euro 2020 qualifying was one of the ten groups to decide which teams would qualify for the UEFA Euro 2020 finals tournament. Group C consisted of five teams: Belarus, Estonia, Germany, Netherlands and Northern Ireland, where they played against each other home-and-away in a round-robin format.

The top two teams, Germany and Netherlands, qualified directly for the finals. Unlike previous editions, the participants of the play-offs were not decided based on results from the qualifying group stage, but instead based on their performance in the 2018–19 UEFA Nations League.

Standings

Matches
The fixtures were released by UEFA the same day as the draw, which was held on 2 December 2018 in Dublin, Ireland. Times are CET/CEST, as listed by UEFA (local times, if different, are in parentheses).

Goalscorers

Discipline
A player was automatically suspended for the next match for the following offences:
 Receiving a red card (red card suspensions could be extended for serious offences)
 Receiving three yellow cards in three different matches, as well as after fifth and any subsequent yellow card (yellow card suspensions were not carried forward to the play-offs, the finals or any other future international matches)
The following suspensions were served during the qualifying matches:

Notes

References

External links
UEFA Euro 2020, UEFA.com
European Qualifiers, UEFA.com

Group C
2019 in Belarusian football
2019 in Estonian football
2018–19 in German football
2019–20 in German football
Germany at UEFA Euro 2020
2018–19 in Dutch football
2019–20 in Dutch football
Netherlands at UEFA Euro 2020
2018–19 in Northern Ireland association football
2019–20 in Northern Ireland association football